The 3rd government of Turkey (22 November 1924 – 3 March 1925) was the third government in the history of the Turkish Republic. It is also known as Fethi Okyar's government.

Background 

The prime minister was Fethi Okyar of the Republican People's Party (CHP). Previously, he was a minister in an Ottoman Empire government and prime minister in pre-Republican Turkey (1923). He was a moderate politician, and his government succeeded İsmet İnönü’s two governments after the Progressive Republican Party began a strong opposition campaign in the parliament.(see Progressive Republican Party (Turkey))

The government
In the list below, the cabinet members who served only a part of the cabinet's lifespan are shown in the column "Notes".

In 1924–1925, surnames were not in use in Turkey, which would remain true until the Surname Law. The surnames given in the list are the surnames the members of the cabinet assumed later.

Aftermath
Fethi Okyar's cabinet fell because it was ineffective in quashing the Sheikh Said rebellion; the next government was again founded by İsmet İnönü.

References

03
Republican People's Party (Turkey) politicians
1924 establishments in Turkey
1925 disestablishments in Turkey
Cabinets established in 1924
Cabinets disestablished in 1925
Members of the 3rd government of Turkey
2nd parliament of Turkey
Republican People's Party (Turkey)